Interrobang (stylized in all lowercase) is the twelfth studio album by American alternative rock band Switchfoot. It was released on August 20, 2021, through Fantasy Records. A deluxe edition was released digitally on July 8, 2022.

Background 

The band wished to explore themes of disunity and common ground, choosing to work with producer Tony Berg as they felt that the stark difference between their Christian viewpoint and his atheistic viewpoint would lend well to these themes.

Track listing 
All tracks stylized in all lowercase.

References

2021 albums
Fantasy Records albums
Switchfoot albums